Ardaris is a Neotropical genus of firetips in the family Hesperiidae. It includes two endemic species that are restricted to mountain forests and páramos in the Cordillera de Mérida, Venezuela.

Species 
 Ardaris eximia (Hewitson, 1871)
 Ardaris hantra Evans, 1951

References 
 A. Orellana (2008) Pyrrhopyginae de Venezuela (Lepidoptera: Hesperioidea: Hesperiidae). Entomotropica, Vol. 23(3): 177-291. 
 A. Orellana (2004) Mariposas de los páramos de la Sierra Nevada y Sierra de La Culata (Cordillera de Mérida, Venezuela). Pp (5) 57-71. En: Andressen R y Monasterio M (Eds.), Memorias del IV Simposio Internacional de Desarrollo Sustentable en Los Andes. La estrategia andina para el siglo XXI. Mérida, Venezuela. Asociación de Montañas Andinas.
 Evans (1951) A Catalogue of the American Hesperiidae indicating the classification and nomenclature adopted in the British Museum (Natural History). Part 1: Introduction and Group A Pyrrhopyginae. Trustees of the British Museum. London.  x+92 pp, 9 láminas. 
 E.Y. Watson (1893) A proposed classification of the Hesperiidae, with a revision of the genera. Proceedings of the Zoological Society of London 3-132

External links 
Natural History Museum Lepidoptera genus database
Butterflies of the Americas

Hesperiidae
Hesperiidae of South America
Hesperiidae genera
Taxa named by Edward Yerbury Watson